Brice Tirabassi (born 15 June 1977) is a French rally driver. He won the Junior World Rally Championship in 2003.

Career
Tirabassi won the French Rally Championship in 2002, before stepping up to the Junior World Rally Championship (JWRC) in 2003. He won three out of seven rounds to take the crown. In 2005, he competed in the Production World Rally Championship. In 2006, he competed in four rounds of the JWRC in a PH Sport-prepared Citroën C2, winning in Corsica. In 2008, he competed in the Intercontinental Rally Challenge in a Peugeot 207 S2000, with a best results of 7th on Rally Russia. Towards the end of the year, he was called up by the Subaru World Rally Team to drive one of their new Subaru Impreza WRCs on the tarmac WRC rounds of Catalunya and Corsica. He finished 10th in Catalunya, but retired with engine failure in Corsica.

Complete WRC results

JWRC results

IRC results

References

External links 
 Profile at eWRC-results.com

1977 births
French rally drivers
Living people
World Rally Championship drivers
Citroën Racing drivers